Slap Shot is an ice hockey game released by Sega in 1990 for their Sega Master System. This game has nothing to do with the 1977 Hollywood film Slap Shot; dealing with international ice hockey teams instead of American minor league ice hockey teams.

Gameplay
Slap Shot'''s game play is very similar to hockey games that came out in the 1980s; mainly NES's Ice Hockey and Konami's Blades of Steel. This game allows the option of choosing to play an exhibition match or in a tournament.

Teams
Slap Shot has 24 different teams split into three pools. Loosely based on IIHF World Championships pools by the time the game was released, the three groups have different difficulty levels, Pool A being the hardest, Pool B being Normal, and Pool C being easiest. It's not possibly to play teams from different pools.

Pool A
 America
 Canada
 Czechoslovakia
 Finland
 Poland
 Sweden
 USSR
 West Germany

Pool B
 Austria
 Denmark
 East Germany
 France
 Italy
 Japan
 Norway
 Switzerland

Pool C
 Australia
 Bulgaria
 China
 Hungary
 Holland
 North Korea
 South Korea
 Yugoslavia

VisualsSlap Shot's visuals are very similar to NES's Ice Hockey (by using the same rink and the players are very very similar to that of Konami's Blades of Steel). However, Slap Shot brought something new to the table that those games did not which it the "Shot Cam Replay" which was only seen in a hockey game call Face Off! for the DOS back in 1988. But other than that, Slap Shot is a clone of Blades of Steel and Ice Hockey''.

References

External links

1990 video games
Ice hockey video games
Sega video games
Master System games
Master System-only games
Sanritsu Denki games
Video games developed in Japan